Thomas Forch is an East German bobsledder who competed in the early 1980s. He won a bronze medal in the four-man event at the 1983 FIBT World Championships in Lake Placid, New York.

References
Bobsleigh four-man world championship medalists since 1930

German male bobsledders
Living people
Year of birth missing (living people)